Enoch Mudge (1776–1850) was the first native New Englander to be ordained as a Methodist minister.

Biography
Born in Lynn, Mass., he was converted under Jesse Lee, the pioneer of Methodism in New England, and entered the ministry in 1793.  He labored as an itinerant preacher in Maine until 1799, when his health gave way and he was forced to retire.  He settled in Orrington, Maine, and was twice chosen Representative to the General Court of Massachusetts, in 1811-12 and 1815-16. In 1811 he had much to do with passing the "Religious Freedom Bill," which repealed a law requiring Massachusetts taxpayers of any denomination to pay taxes to support the Congregational Church. In 1814 he was chaplain to a Maine militia regiment that participated in the Battle of Hampden during the War of 1812. In 1816 he moved back to Massachusetts and resumed preaching.  From 1832 to 1844 he was pastor of the Seamen's Bethel in New Bedford. There Herman Melville heard him preach, and Mudge was one of the models for the character of Father Mapple in Moby-Dick. Enoch Mudge was the father of Thomas H. Mudge and the uncle of Zachariah A. Mudge.

References

External links
 Enoch Mudge Biography

1776 births
1850 deaths
People from Lynn, Massachusetts
American Methodist clergy
19th-century Methodist ministers
Members of the Massachusetts House of Representatives
War of 1812 chaplains